Petrivka is an urban-type settlement in Berezivka Raion of Odesa Oblast in Ukraine. Petrivka belongs to Velykyi Buialyk rural hromada, one of the hromadas of Ukraine. Population: 

Until 18 July 2020, Petrivka belonged to Ivanivka Raion. The raion was abolished in July 2020 as part of the administrative reform of Ukraine, which reduced the number of raions of Odesa Oblast to seven. The area of Ivanivka Raion was merged into Berezivka Raion.

Economy

Transportation
Buialyk railway station is located on the railway connecting Odesa and Kropyvnytskyi via Novoukrainka. There is some passenger traffic.

The settlement is connected by road with Odesa, Voznesensk, and has access to Highway M05 which connects Kyiv and Odesa.

References

Urban-type settlements in Berezivka Raion